The 2002–03 Virginia Cavaliers men's basketball team represented the University of Virginia during the 2002–03 NCAA Division I men's basketball season. The team was led by fifth-year head coach Pete Gillen, and played their home games at University Hall in Charlottesville, Virginia as members of the Atlantic Coast Conference.

Last season
The Cavaliers had a record of 17–12, with a conference record of 7–9. They competed in the first round of the 2002 National Invitation Tournament, where they lost at home in the first round to South Carolina.

Roster

Schedule 

|-
!colspan=9 style="background:#00214e; color:#f56d22;"| Exhibition game

|-
!colspan=9 style="background:#00214e; color:#f56d22;"| Regular season

|-
!colspan=9 style="background:#00214e; color:#f56d22;"| ACC Tournament

|-
!colspan=9 style="background:#00214e; color:#f56d22;"| National Invitation Tournament

References

Virginia Cavaliers men's basketball seasons
Virginia
Virginia
Virginia Cavaliers men's basketball
2003 in sports in Virginia